Sixties Power Ballads - The Greatest Driving Anthems in the World... Ever! is an edition in The Greatest Driving Anthems in the World... Ever! series, which is a part of The Best... Album in the World...Ever! brand. This album was released October 22, 2007 and includes some of the biggest power ballads the 1960s had to offer.

Track listing

Disc 1
Dusty Springfield - "You Don't Have to Say You Love Me" (1965)
The Righteous Brothers - "You've Lost That Lovin' Feelin'" (1965)
The Walker Brothers - "The Sun Ain't Gonna Shine (Anymore)" (1968)
Ike & Tina Turner - "River Deep - Mountain High" (1969)
Joe Cocker - "With a Little Help from My Friends" (1968)
Small Faces - "All or Nothing" (1967)
The Four Tops - "Reach Out I'll Be There" (1963)
Diana Ross & The Supremes - "Love Child" (1968)
Love Affair - "Everlasting Love" (1967)
Chris Farlowe - "Out Of Time" (1967)
Gary Puckett & The Union Gap - "Young Girl" (1965)
Cupid's Inspiration - "Yesterday Has Gone" (1967)
Barry Ryan - "Eloise" (1968)
Tom Jones - "Delilah" (1969)
Engelbert Humperdinck - "A Man Without Love" (1968)
Shirley Bassey - "Goldfinger" (1964)
The Marbles - "Only One Woman" (1965)
Rod Stewart - "Handbags and Gladrags" (1967)
Nina Simone - "Feeling Good" (1965)
Fleetwood Mac - "Man Of The World" (1969)
Procol Harum - "A Salty Dog" (1967)
The Moody Blues - "Nights in White Satin" (1967/1972)

Disc 2
Roy Orbison - "Running Scared" (1963)
Ben E. King - "Stand By Me" (1961)
Aretha Franklin - "(You Make Me Feel Like) A Natural Woman" (1967)
Erma Franklin - "Piece of My Heart" (1967)
The Animals - "Bring It On Home to Me" (1967)
Billy Fury - "Halfway To Paradise" (1964)
The Casuals - "Jesamine" (1966)
Gene Pitney - "Something's Gotten Hold of My Heart" (1964)
Percy Sledge - "When A Man Loves A Woman" (1966)
Otis Redding - "Try a Little Tenderness" (1967)
Irma Thomas - "Time Is on My Side" (1967)
Brian Auger & Julie Driscoll - "Road to Cairo" (1963)
Nina Simone - "I Put a Spell on You" (1962)
Amen Corner - "Gin House Blues" (1967)
Chicken Shack - "I'd Rather Go Blind" (1964)
P. P. Arnold - "The First Cut Is the Deepest" (1969)
Ray Pollard - "The Drifter" (1967)
The Box Tops - "The Letter" (1968)
Scott Walker - "Montague Terrace (In Blue)" (1964)
Maxine Brown - "Oh No Not My Baby" (1965)
James Brown - "It's a Man's Man's Man's World" (1967)
Lorraine Ellison - "Stay With Me Baby" (1965)

Disc 3
Tom Jones - "I'll Never Fall in Love Again" (1967)
Jackie Trent - "Where Are You Now (My Love)" (1967)
Dusty Springfield - "I Just Don't Know What to Do with Myself" (1965)
The Walker Brothers - "Make It Easy on Yourself" (1969)
Long John Baldry - "Let the Heartaches Begin" (1967)
The Righteous Brothers - "Unchained Melody" (1965)
Engelbert Humperdinck - "Release Me" (1969)
Vikki Carr - "It Must Be Him" (1965)
Cilla Black - "You're My World" (1964)
Petula Clark - "Downtown" (1965)
Lulu - "To Sir with Love" (1967)
Gene Pitney - "I'm Gonna Be Strong" (1963)
Shirley Bassey - "What Now My Love" (1963)
Andy Williams - "The Impossible Dream" (1960)
Scott Walker - "Joanna" (1968)
P. J. Proby - "Maria" (1967)
Long John Baldry - "MacArthur Park" (1966)
The Animals - "The House of the Rising Sun" (1964)
The Hollies - "He Ain't Heavy, He's My Brother" (1969)
Gerry & The Pacemakers - "You'll Never Walk Alone" (1965)

References

 Sixties Power Ballads (front- and backcover)
 [ Sixties Power Ballads]

2007 compilation albums